Walter E. Ambord (September 25, 1930 – February 19, 2016) was an American football player and coach. He served as the head football coach at Pomona College in Claremont, California from 1962 to 1977, compiling a record of 50–91–4. Ambord also coached baseball, wrestling, and golf at Pomona and was an associate professor of physical education at the school from 1960 to 1986. 

Ambord was born in Dorris, California and moved as a child with his family to San Fernando, California. He attended North Hollywood High School, lettering in football, baseball, and track before graduating in 1948. He spent two years at Valley Junior College in Van Nuys, co-captaining the football team as a sophomore and also participating in basketball, and baseball, and track. Ambord then moved on to Los Angeles State College—now known as California State University, Los Angeles. He played football for the Los Angeles Diablos, serving as team captain of the 1954 team and earning all-California Collegiate Athletic Association as a senior. In 1955, Ambord had a brief stint with the Washington Redskins of the National Football League (NFL).

Ambord began his coaching career in 1955 as an assistant varsity football coach at Mount Carmel High School in Los Angeles. During two years as an assistant coach, Mount Carmel won consecutive league titles. In 1957, Ambord was promoted to head coach at Mount Carmel and led the team for three seasons. He joined the coaching staff at Pomona in 1960 and was an assistant football coach for two seasons before succeeding Chuck Mills as head football coach in 1962.

Head coaching record

College football

References

1930 births
2016 deaths
American football halfbacks
Cal State Los Angeles Diablos football players
Pomona-Pitzer Sagehens baseball coaches
Pomona-Pitzer Sagehens football coaches
College golf coaches in the United States
College wrestling coaches in the United States
Junior college baseball players in the United States
Junior college football players in the United States
Junior college men's basketball players in the United States
High school football coaches in California
People from Siskiyou County, California
Coaches of American football from California
Players of American football from California
Baseball coaches from California
Baseball players from California
Basketball players from California
Track and field athletes from California